SS Manchuria was a passenger and cargo liner launched 1903 for the San Francisco-trans Pacific service of the Pacific Mail Steamship Company. During World War I the ship was commissioned 25 April 1918–11 September 1919 for United States Navy service as USS Manchuria (ID-1633). After return to civilian service the ship was acquired by the Dollar Steamship Line in 1928 until that line suffered financial difficulties in 1938 and ownership of Manchuria was taken over by the United States Maritime Commission which chartered the ship to American President Lines which operated her as President Johnson. During World War II she operated as a War Shipping Administration transport with American President Lines its agent allocated to United States Army requirements. After World War II, she was returned to American President Lines, sold and renamed Santa Cruz. The liner was scrapped in Italy in 1952.

Construction
Manchuria was laid down by the New York Shipbuilding Company of Camden, New Jersey, for the Pacific Mail Steamship Company on 3 September 1902, among the first ships built at the yard as contract number six. An attempt to launch the ship on 31 October 1903 failed when the ship stuck on the ways. The ship was successfully launched on 2 November having been sponsored by Miss Laura Wick.

Both were among the largest ships being built in the United States as had been the line's previous trans Pacific liners Korea and Siberia of 1902 and both were given the American Bureau of Shipping rating and Lloyd's Register classification of 100-A1. At the time of construction the two vessels were the largest passenger ships built in the United States and were built for 346 first class, 66 second class and 1,300 steerage passengers.

On completion of a major refit 19 January 1929 for Dollar Line's around the world service the ship's tonnage is noted as being  with a "sea speed" of  indicating possible propulsion upgrades.

The hull was double bottomed with a capacity of 2,270 tons of fresh water for boilers or ship use with trimming tanks in the peaks and three deep tanks, one forward and two aft of the engine room, for a total water ballast of 4,600 tons. There were five complete decks composed of orlop, lower, middle, upper and shelter decks with the strength deck at the shelter deck rather than usual upper deck with ten watertight bulkheads running up to the upper deck. Normal coal capacity was 1,950 tons but that could be increased by use of reserve bunkers to 2,800 tons.

There was a small auxiliary boiler located on the middle deck aft of the after fire room hatch. A combined fire extinguishing and fumigation system could send gas for either purpose throughout the ship.

First-class passengers had quarters in the midship house on the bridge and shelter decks with access to a saloon lighted by a skylight and dining room. Some rooms had private lavatories, but lavatories for men and another for women were located aft of the engine casing on the shelter deck with another set in the center of the bridge deck accommodations. The upper deck was fitted for either light cargo or steerage passengers and, in the event of Chinese steerage passengers, had provision for a Chinese galley and wash area.

Early career
Manchuria departed New York on 9 June 1904 for San Francisco to begin Pacific service with sister ship . In connection with the United States recently having acquired territories of the Philippines, Guam and Hawaii and President Theodore Roosevelt wanted to show American influence in the area. He decided to send a diplomatic delegation to the area. On 8 July 1905 the Manchuria left San Francisco with a delegation led by Secretary of War William Howard Taft. As of 1907 Pacific Mail shows  Manchuria, along with Mongolia, as being chartered vessels, though the company had paid for both Korea and Siberia, thus adding to an operating deficit for the period. Additional problems had fallen on the company, the disruption of the 1906 San Francisco earthquake and fire, political instability in Central American republics and specific "disasters" to Manchuria and Mongolia in Hawaiian waters. Manchuria was disabled at Oahu and had to be put into dry dock in November 1906 for repairs that were completed by 1 June 1907 but her exit was delayed by San Francisco strikes and delayed permanent repairs to Mongolia that had been damaged in an incident at Midway.

The disaster to Manchuria occurred at 4:10 in the morning on 20 August 1906 when the ship went aground between Rabbit Island and Oahu resulting first in evacuation of passengers and mail during the day as efforts were organized to pull the ship off the reef. Damage progressed even as the efforts to pull the ship off the reef continued over a period of days with mention "boilers are starting from their foundation and may go out of commission" in a communication dated 23 August. At 12:50 in the afternoon of 16 September Manchuria is noted as "coming off the reef" and being towed stern first. It had taken a small fleet of vessels, including the Commercial Pacific Cable Company's , "USS Manning"<ref group=note>Manning, despite court references, was not in U.S.N. commission at the time but was under the United States Revenue Cutter Service and taking her 13 December 1905–8 May 1907 Hawaiian break from Bering Sea Patrol duties.</ref> and  among various commercial and government vessels involved in taking off passengers, luggage, mail and cargo, delivering water and supplies and other functions. The apparent misunderstanding of the arrangements for Restorer in the salvage resulted in claims in court.

The strange "coincidence" of two of the company's ships stranding in the Hawaiian Islands within hours and the brief stranding of the Army transport from the Philippines, also aground on Oahu, was likely not coincidental. The 1906 Valparaíso earthquake had occurred hours earlier and mariners' descriptions of a "tremor" spreading on the Pacific's bed and "disturbing currents" at the time of the strandings would now be recognized as indications of tsunami effects.

By 1907 predictions of economic trouble had become fact with the consequence, in the words of His Majesty's consul in Manila in his report for 1907, that "the American flag disappears from the Pacific trade with the single exception of the Northern Pacific Steamship Company's passenger-freighter Minnesota." Robert Dollar noted that Pacific Mail anticipated enforcement of a seamen's act that would "make it impossible to operate American ships profitably in foreign trade" competing with foreign lines and sold its ships before waiting until the act was actually enforced—as it was not. In a Pacific left "almost devoid of the American flag" by 1916 the five ships Korea, Siberia, China, Mongolia and Manchuria had been sold in the fall of 1915 to International Mercantile Marine Company for $5,250,000 (£1,075,000) which registered most of its ships under the British flag. The ship began service with one of International Mercantile Marine's subsidiary companies, the American Line, in 1915.

At 19:16 on 13 June 1917, Manchuria was standing out of New York Harbor in a thick fog when she collided with the United States Navy monitor , suffering damage below the waterline. Attempting to clear, Manchuria scraped the Amphitrite′s bow, and her propeller strut fouled her cable, holding her fast for 20 minutes. Manchuria lowered her boats and her crew abandoned ship; two section patrol boats and a motor sailer stood by and took her lifeboats in tow. Ultimately, Manchuria was towed and beached off Tompkinsville, Staten Island, New York.

World War I

The United States Shipping Board requisitioned Manchuria and Mongolia from the Atlantic Transport Line, a subsidiary of International Mercantile Marine, and turned the ships over to the Army in January and February, 1918. The two ships were among the largest transports with a troop capacity of around 5,000. In late January 1918, with the "shipping situation getting out of hand" the regular meeting of top government and military logistics people decided to create the Shipping Control Committee (SCC) that was ratified in early February with the consequence the Army turned its entire fleet over to the SCC resulting in the Navy operating those ships.Manchuria was acquired by the Navy from the United States Shipping Board on 10 April 1918 and commissioned USS Manchuria (ID-1633) at New York on 25 April 1918 and assigned to the Cruiser and Transport Force. Manchuria departed New York with a convoy on 30 April with the 18th Field Artillery and the 153d and 154th Infantry Battalions embarked for Europe arriving in Saint-Nazaire, France, on 13 May to debark her passengers. Five days later she returned to the east coast, arriving at New York on 30 May.

The troop transport made 13 round trips to Europe with nine of them after the Armistice, bringing approximately 39,500 troops home. On 25 August 1919 she arrived New York, decommissioned there 11 September, and was returned to her owner.

Interwar yearsManchuria began service on the New York to Hamburg with the American Line in December 1919.

In 1923 she was shifted to New York–Panama Canal–San Francisco run to operate under another subsidiary of International Mercantile Marine Co., the Panama Pacific Line.

In November 1924 the ship and line's regularly scheduled ports of call for Manchuria, Mongolia,  and  included San Diego, with the new schedule being New York and San Diego, Los Angeles, San Francisco and Oakland, California, Portland, Oregon and Seattle and Tacoma, Washington. Until the scheduled departure of Manchuria from New York on 12 February 1925 only passenger traffic had been accepted for San Diego, but with regional and city leaders urging service the line began accepting freight as well beginning that departure.

On 1 November 1928 she was renamed President Johnson and sold seven days later to Dollar Steamship Lines for round‑the‑world cruises. On 3 November 1928 Dollar delivered the ship to Newport News Shipbuilding & Drydock Company for a major refit and passenger space renovation that was completed 19 January 1929. All old first class quarters were stripped and replaced with seventy-five staterooms and twenty-five new private baths for 175 first class passengers. Much of the interior decoration and furnishing was done in San Francisco and shipped east to the shipyard for installation. A steel tank swimming pool was added on top of the after deck house.President Johnson was being featured in the first class only around the world service "as you please" with 1930 fares as low as $1,110 or $1,370 with private bath and tickets good for two years for visiting twenty-two ports in fourteen countries. Departures from the United States by a President liner every two weeks from the Puget Sound ports for Japan and around the world while another President liner departed New York every two weeks for Cuba and California by the Panama Canal and then from Seattle and Vancouver, Canada for the voyage to Japan and around the world. In 1933 the ship was chartered for the 7th Annual Floating University around the world voyage of 137 days visiting 37 countries and islands, 45 ports and 140 cities and places with credit granted by special arrangement throu universities. The ship, to depart 4 February from New York, is described as a "floating campus" with class rooms, library, athletic facilities with student fares as low as $1,325 including tuition and shore trips.

The Dollar Steamship Company, along with other Dollar companies and the ships were acquired by the United States Maritime Commission in an Adjustment Agreement on 15 August 1938 in which stock in the line was transferred to release $7,500,000 of the line's debt. The commission invested $4,500,000 in the new American President Lines with, over the years, $20,000,000 in grants to the line.

World War II
On 29 November 1941 the War Shipping Administration (WSA) took control of President Johnson from American President Lines and allocated the ship for Army use, though the ship was operated by American President Lines as the WSA agent.President Johnson, along with the Army chartered  and the Army transport , departed from San Francisco for the Philippines on 5 December with 2,500 troops, the 2d Battalion of the 138th Field Artillery Regiment and three squadrons of the 35th Pursuit Group aboard. Upon the attack on Pearl Harbor the ships, including the WSA transport  which had departed 6 December, turned back and unloaded the some 15,000 troops and supplies aboard the ships 8–9 December. On 31 January 1942 the ship left San Francisco transporting the garrison for Christmas Island, code named BIRCH, that was a critical link in the South Pacific lines of communication to Australia. The garrison, designated Task Force 4591, transported was composed of an infantry battalion, two battalions of coast artillery, the 12th Pursuit Squadron and the 150-bed 1st Station Hospital composed of 14 officers and 100 enlisted men for a total of about 2,000 troops that arrived at the island 10 February.President Johnson continued transporting troops for the next two years in support of the amphibious operations which had penetrated by July 1945 to the Japanese home islands. With stops at Eniwetok and Guam, Marshalls; Ulithi, Carolines; Peleliu, Palaus; and Espiritu Santo, New Hebrides, long behind her, President Johnson returned to San Francisco 14 January 1946 to end her World War II service as a troop transport.

Later careerPresident Johnson was redelivered to control of American President Lines on 2 March 1946. The Maritime Commission approved the sale of the ship to Transmar Ltd. of Lisbon and change to Panamanian registry. On 10 January 1947 President Johnson was sold to Tagus Navigational Co. of Panama City, Panama and renamed Santa Cruz. The ship was intended for general trade between Portugal and South American ports in Brazil and Argentina with particular attention to emigrants from Portugal to those countries. General Engineering & Dry Dock Company was contracted to remove all armament and military equipment, convert the troop berthing spaces into spaces for 1,200 steerage passengers, convert the troop ship officer's quarters into space for 134 cabin class passengers and restoration of the public spaces (Social Hall, Tea Room Verandah, Smoking Room and dining) of the ship to civilian levels. Machinery was examined, overhauled and replaced where necessary and the ship's plumbing and electrical systems modified for the rearranged spaces. The work, costing well over $1,000,000 was completed in thirty-eight days. She was chartered to Societa Saicen of Savona, Italy, in 1948 to transport Italian war refugees to South America. The transport was scrapped at Savona on 12 January 1952.

Notable passengers

 Li Bi Cu, medical doctor, 1905 

 Footnotes 

References

Bibliography

 
 
 
 
 
 
 
 
 
 
 
 
 
 
 
 
 
 
 
 
 
 
 
 
 
 
 
 
 

External links

 Panama-Pacific at San Diego (Article on new San Diego service with three U.S. Navy air photos of Manchuria'' approaching and in port.)
 Dollar Round-the-World Liner President Johnson (Photos after 1929 refit and remodeling.}
 
 Art Modern in Passenger Accommodations (Referenced above but with intervening advertisements with illustrations of ship spaces and features running between pages 
 Photo gallery at Naval Historical Center
 "President Johnson Reconverted for Portugal-South American Route"

1903 ships
Ocean liners
Passenger ships of the United States
Ships built by New York Shipbuilding Corporation
World War I passenger ships of the United States
World War I auxiliary ships of the United States
Troop ships of the War Shipping Administration
Passenger ships of Italy
Maritime incidents in 1917